The 1989 World Taekwondo Championships were the 9th edition of the World Taekwondo Championships, and were held in Seoul, South Korea from October 9 to October 14, 1989, with 446 athletes participating from 59 countries.

Medal summary

Men

Women

Medal table

References
WTF Medal Winners

Taekwondo Championships
Taekwondo Championships
World Taekwondo Championships
International taekwondo competitions hosted by South Korea
Sport in Seoul
Taekwondo competitions in South Korea